Anadia bogotensis, the Bogota anadia, is a species of lizard in the family Gymnophthalmidae. It is endemic to Colombia.

References

Anadia (genus)
Reptiles of Colombia
Endemic fauna of Colombia
Reptiles described in 1863
Taxa named by Wilhelm Peters